Kostadin Hazurov (born 5 August 1985) is a former Bulgarian footballer who played as a striker.

Career
Hazurov began his career at Pirin. In 2004, he moved to CSKA Sofia making his official debut in Bulgarian A Professional Football Group in a match against Botev Plovdiv on 27 March 2004. The result of the match was 4:1 with win for CSKA. Two months later, in May 2004, Hazurov scored three goals against Belasitsa Petrich (he is the youngest player in the A PFG to have achieved such a feat). In the following season he scored 6 goals in 22 league games for the eventual league champions.

In 2005 Hazurov joined Litex Lovech. On 14 August 2005, he sustained an injury in a match against his former club CSKA Sofia, which kept him out of action for five months, but eventually Hazurov began regaining his shape. Whilst at Lovech he spent several loan spells at Dunav Ruse, Pirin Blagoevgrad and Vidima-Rakovski. Overall, he played just 15 times in 3 years. Having failed to break into the Litex first team, Hazurov joined Minyor Pernik on 9 June 2008, where he had difficulty becoming a regular starter, frequently being benched.

Bnei Sakhnin
On 12 January 2011, Hazurov joined Israeli Premier League side Bnei Sakhnin. His debut came a three days later in a match against Maccabi Tel Aviv, which Bnei Sakhnin lost 3–1. He scored his first goal on 23 January in a 2–1 away win against Maccabi Petah Tikva. Hazurov went on to score four goals for Bnei Sakhnin to the end of the season.

Lierse
On 22 May 2012, Hazurov signed a two-year contract with Belgian Jupiler Pro League side Lierse S.K.

CSKA Sofia
He rejoined CSKA Sofia in the summer 2015, quickly establishing himself as a key player and top scorer for the team, managing 36 goals in all competitions.

Neftochimic
In June 2016, Hazurov became part of newly promoted Neftochimic Burgas' squad.

CSKA 1948
On 14 July 2017, Hazurov signed with Third League club CSKA 1948. On 15 August 2017, he decided to leave the club, having made one appearance only.

International career
Between 2004 and 2006 Kostadin Hazurov played in Bulgaria national under-21 football team. In 2004, he played in 1 match in Bulgaria national football team.

Personal life
His cousin, Borislav Hazurov, is also a footballer.

Honours

Club
CSKA Sofia
 A Group: 2004–05
 Bulgarian Cup: 2015–16

References

External links
 

1985 births
Living people
People from Gotse Delchev
Bulgarian footballers
Bulgaria under-21 international footballers
Bulgaria international footballers
OFC Pirin Blagoevgrad players
PFC Pirin Blagoevgrad players
PFC CSKA Sofia players
PFC Litex Lovech players
FC Dunav Ruse players
PFC Vidima-Rakovski Sevlievo players
PFC Minyor Pernik players
Bnei Sakhnin F.C. players
Lierse S.K. players
Maccabi Petah Tikva F.C. players
Neftochimic Burgas players
FC Lokomotiv 1929 Sofia players
First Professional Football League (Bulgaria) players
Israeli Premier League players
Belgian Pro League players
Bulgarian expatriate footballers
Bulgarian expatriate sportspeople in Israel
Bulgarian expatriate sportspeople in Belgium
Expatriate footballers in Israel
Expatriate footballers in Belgium
Association football forwards
Sportspeople from Blagoevgrad Province